This is a list of presidents of South West State of Somalia, a federated state that is part of the Federal Republic of Somalia.

List

See also 

 List of presidents of Hirshabelle
 List of Presidents of Puntland
 Lists of office-holders

References

External links 

 Countries Se-So - Somalia

South West State of Somalia
South West State presidents
South West State presidents